This is an incomplete list of Sheriffs of Cambridgeshire and Huntingdonshire in England from 1154 until the abolition of the office in 1965.

Exceptionally, the two counties shared a single sheriff. Sheriffs had a one-year term of office, being appointed at a meeting of the privy council generally held in February or March and holding office until the similar meeting in the next year. In 1648 it became the practice to rotate the office between inhabitants of Cambridgeshire proper, the Isle of Ely and Huntingdonshire. This was done in a three-year cycle, with an inhabitant of each area occupying the office in turn.

Note: the years shown are the date of commencement of the sheriff's year of office. For example, the high sheriff appointed in March 1892 "for the year 1892" held office until March 1893.

Before 1200
Before 1154 –  See High Sheriff of Cambridgeshire
1154: Richard Basset and Aubrey de Vere
1155–1161: Payn and Robert Grimball
1162: Nicholai de Chenet
Michaelmas 1163: Hamo Petom or Pecc'm
1165: Hamo Petom and Philip de Daventry
Easter 1166: Philip de Daventry
1166–1168: Philip de Daventry
Easter 1170: Everard de Beach and Warin de Basingborn
1171–1176: Everard de Beach
Easter 1177: Walter son of Hugonis
1180: Walter son of Hugonis and William, son of Stephen
Michaelmas 1182: Radulph or Ralph de Bardulf
1183: Walter son of Hugonis
Michaelmas 1185: Nicholas, son of Robert
1189: Nicholas son of Robert
Michaelmas 1189: William Muschet
Michaelmas 1191: Richard Anglicus
Michaelmas 1192: Richard (Reginald) de Argenton
1196: Thomas de Huntsdon
Michaelmas 1195: Werricus de Marignes
1197: Merric de Marignes
Michaelmas 1197: Robert de Lisle

1200–1299

1300–1399

1400–1499

1500–1599

1600–1699

1700–1799

1800–1899

1900–1965

1965 onwards: See High Sheriff of Cambridgeshire and Isle of Ely and High Sheriff of Huntingdon and Peterborough

References

Bibliography

 (with amendments of 1963, Public Record Office)
 The History of the Worthies of England Volume 1

History of Cambridgeshire
 
Cambridgeshire and Huntingdonshire
History of Huntingdonshire